Calana District is one of ten districts of Tacna Province in Peru.

References